Lenoir High School is a historic high school complex and national historic district located at Lenoir, Caldwell County, North Carolina. It was designed by the architectural firm Benton & Benton and built in 1922. It is a two-story, Classical Revival-style brick school with cast stone detailing.  An addition was made in 1962.  Connected to the main building by brick walls is the contributing 1935–1937 band building with additions. The property also has an original stone retaining wall. Lenoir High School closed its doors in 1977, when it merged with Gamewell-Collettsville High School and moved across town to form West Caldwell High School. The Lenoir High School building was then Willow St Middle School until 1981. The property was vacant for eight years before becoming a senior housing facility in 1989.

The school was listed on the National Register of Historic Places in 1990.

Notable alumni
 Claude Baker – composer of contemporary classical music
 Jim Broyhill – former U.S. Representative and Senator from the state of North Carolina
 Bob Gibbons – sports scout specializing in high school basketball players
 Harry Martin – Associate Justice of the North Carolina Supreme Court, serving from 1982 to 1992
 Magruder Tuttle – real admiral in the U.S. Navy
 Rube Walker – MLB catcher
 Verlon "Rube" Walker – MLB coach with the Chicago Cubs from 1961 to 1970

References

High schools in North Carolina
School buildings on the National Register of Historic Places in North Carolina
Historic districts on the National Register of Historic Places in North Carolina
Neoclassical architecture in North Carolina
School buildings completed in 1922
Buildings and structures in Caldwell County, North Carolina
National Register of Historic Places in Caldwell County, North Carolina
1922 establishments in North Carolina